Nyatri Tsenpo was a king of Tibet. He was a legendary progenitor of the Yarlung dynasty.  His reign is said to have begun in 127 BC and in traditional Tibetan history, he was the first ruler of the kingdom. The Dunhuang chronicles report that he is said to have descended from heaven onto the sacred mountain Yarlha Shampo.  Due to certain physical peculiarities – his hands were webbed, and his eyelids closed from the bottom and not the top – he was hailed as a god by locals, and they took him as their king.

According to Tibetan mythology, the first Tibetan building, Yungbulakang Palace, was erected for the king.  The year of his enthronement marks the first year of the Tibetan calendar; Losar, the Tibetan New Year, is celebrated in his honor. Traditions hold that the first kings were immortal, and would be pulled up to heaven by the cord that had first deposited them on earth.  This is what is said to have happened to Nyatri Tsenpo as well.

References 

Tibetan emperors
Legendary progenitors
Founding monarchs